Battigrassiella is a genus of nicoletiids in the family Nicoletiidae, containing one described species, B. wheeleri.

References

Further reading

 
 

Monotypic insect genera
Articles created by Qbugbot
Zygentoma